Jorge Fernández Madinabeitia (born 8 August 1972 in Alicante, Spain) is a Spanish TV presenter, model, actor and basketball player from the Basque Country.

Biography
Born in Alicante, Fernández was raised in the Gipuzkoan town of Mondragón/Arrasate. Fernández is graduated in sports from the University of the Basque Country at the Basque Institute of Physical Education in Vitoria and worked as a sports teacher at the Virgen Niña school in Gasteiz.

When he was 26, he joined a model academy in San Sebastián. He was also a basketball player debuting in Liga ACB with the TAU Ceramica Baskonia from Vitoria-Gasteiz in 1998. In 1999 he won the title of Mister Spain, a title he retained in 2000 since no competition was held that year; he is to date the only man who has been Mister Spain for two consecutive years. After his Mister Spain title, he started his artistic career as an actor and presenter of numerous TV shows, such as Los Serrano (2003–2008).

Fernández works as the host of the game show La Ruleta de la Suerte on Antena 3 and the reality show Esta casa era una ruina. In 2008 he received the Ondas Award for "Best TV presenter."

Works
 Euskadi Reta
 Gran Hermano (2001–2002). Host.
 Los Serrano (2003–2008). as Andrés.
 La quinta esfera (2003). Host.
 Gran Hermano VIP: El Desafío (2004). Host.
 El verano de tu vida (2005). Host with Ivonne Reyes.
 Gente de Primera (2005). Host.
 Los más (2006). Host with Paula Vázquez
 La Ruleta de la Suerte (2006–present). Host.
 Esta casa era una ruina (2007-2010). Host.

References

External links
 

1972 births
Living people
People from Alicante
Sportspeople from Gipuzkoa
Male actors from the Basque Country (autonomous community)
Spanish men's basketball players
Spanish television presenters
Spanish male models
University of the Basque Country alumni
People from Mondragón
Spanish schoolteachers
Basketball players from the Basque Country (autonomous community)